The South Africa cricket team toured England from July to September 2022 to play three Test matches, three One Day International (ODI) and three Twenty20 International (T20I) matches. The Test matches formed part of the 2021–2023 ICC World Test Championship. In addition to the matches against England, South Africa had also played two T20I matches against the Ireland cricket team in Bristol.

In November 2021, the England and Wales Cricket Board (ECB) announced that Yorkshire County Cricket Club had been suspended from hosting international matches, following the racism experienced by Azeem Rafiq. Headingley was originally named as the venue for the third ODI. In January 2022, the ECB set Yorkshire the deadline of spring 2022 to meet certain conditions to regain their international status for the match, with the suspension being lifted the following month.

At the end of June 2022, South Africa named their squads for the tour. Their limited overs captain Temba Bavuma was ruled out of the tour due to injury, with Keshav Maharaj and David Miller named as the captains of their ODI and T20I squads respectively. On 18 July 2022, England's Ben Stokes announced that he would retire from ODI cricket following the first match of the series, citing the physical and mental demands of playing all three formats.

South Africa won the opening ODI match by 62 runs, after they had made their highest team total in the format in England. The second ODI was reduced to 29 overs per side due to rain, with England winning the match by 118 runs. South Africa were bowled out for 83 runs, their joint-lowest total against England in an ODI match. The third ODI finished as a no result after only 27.4 overs of play was possible, with the series drawn 1–1.

England won the opening T20I by 41 runs, with Moeen Ali scoring the fastest fifty for England in the format, and the team making their second-highest total in a T20I match. South Africa won the second T20I by 58 runs to level the series, with Rilee Rossouw scoring 96 not out. South Africa won the third T20I by 90 runs to win the series 2–1.

South Africa won the first Test by an innings and 12 runs, with the match ending in three days. England won the second Test by an innings and 85 runs to level the series with one match to play. The first day of the final Test was washed out due to rain after England won the toss, and following the death of Queen Elizabeth II at the age of 96 at Balmoral Castle that day, the second day's play was cancelled as a mark of respect. The third day's play was started with tributes paid to the Queen, including a minute's silence followed by the national anthems. Both the teams and match officials were wearing black armbands. England won the final Test by 9 wickets in the first hour of the final day, to win the series 2–1.

Squads

Brydon Carse was ruled out of England's squad for the third ODI due to a bruised toe. Duanne Olivier was ruled out of South Africa's Test squad due to a hip injury. Rassie van der Dussen was ruled out of South Africa's squad for the third Test due to a left index finger injury. Wiaan Mulder was named as his replacement. Jonny Bairstow was ruled out of England's squad for the third Test after sustaining a possible broken leg while playing golf. Ben Duckett replaced Bairstow in the squad.

Tour matches
Prior to the ODI series, South Africa played two 50-over matches against the England Lions. The England Lions won the first match by six wickets, with South Africa winning the second match by 107 runs.

ODI series

1st ODI

2nd ODI

3rd ODI

T20I series

1st T20I

2nd T20I

3rd T20I

Test series

1st Test

2nd Test

3rd Test

Ireland vs South Africa

Squads

Before the series, Craig Young was forced to withdraw from Ireland's squad with Graham Hume named as his replacement. Kagiso Rabada was also ruled out of South Africa's squad due to an ankle injury.

T20I series

1st T20I

2nd T20I

Notes

References

External links
 England series home at ESPN Cricinfo
 Ireland series home at ESPN Cricinfo

2022 in English cricket
2022 in South African cricket
International cricket competitions in 2022
South African cricket tours of England